Rachel Robertson (born 20 July 1976) is a New Zealand field hockey player who competed in the 2004 Summer Olympics.

References

External links
 

1976 births
Living people
New Zealand female field hockey players
Olympic field hockey players of New Zealand
Field hockey players at the 2004 Summer Olympics
21st-century New Zealand women